The 1966 Tipperary Senior Hurling Championship was the 76th staging of the Tipperary Senior Hurling Championship since its establishment by the Tipperary County Board in 1887.

Thurles Sarsfields were the defending champions.

On 6 November 1966, Carrick Davins won the championship after a 2-12 to 1-02 defeat of Lorrha in the final at Thurles Sportsfield. It was their first ever championship title.

Results

Final

References

Tipperary
Tipperary Senior Hurling Championship